USOC may stand for:
 United States Olympic & Paralympic Committee
 Universal Service Order Code for telephone wiring
 U.S. Open Cup soccer competition